All About You is the second studio album by American recording artist Jeremih, released on September 28, 2010 by Def Jam Recordings. The album's production was handled by frequent producer Mick Schultz, and was supported by the two singles; "I Like" featuring Ludacris and "Down on Me" featuring 50 Cent, the latter of which was a huge success hit. Initially, All About You was proved to be less successful than his debut album, however years later in 2017, the album was certified Gold by the RIAA before his debut was eligible for certification.

Singles 
On June 1, 2010, Jeremih released the first single from the album, titled "I Like" featuring Ludacris. The second single from the album, called "Down on Me" featuring 50 Cent. The video for the song was shot in 3D and also features 50 Cent. Later on the third single titled "Love Don't Change" was released.

Critical reception 

All About You was met with a generally mixed reviews from music critics. Andy Kellman of Allmusic gave the album 2.5 stars out of five, saying "Like his self-titled debut, which coasted to the Top Ten of the Billboard 200, Jeremih’s All About You is produced by partner Mick Schultz. Schultz’s beats on Jeremih amalgamated the styles of numerous contemporaries, and there is not much advancement on the follow-up, while the opening “All About You” is pretty close to a direct swipe of the-Dream's “Shawty Is a 10.” Jeremih often sounds drowsy, detached, and slumped in his VIP club booth, instead of on the prowl. Nothing approaches the bounding swagger of the debut’s “Break Up to Make Up,” and “Wanna Get Up,” the most overt dance floor track, lacks the appeal of “Runway” and is ultimately forgettable. Worst of all is “Holding On,” an earnest, vaguely inspirational ballad song not built for Jeremih’s voice, which is best suited for lecherous material. The highlights, unsurprisingly, are the ballads for the bedroom, though some of the lyrics—like “That’s right, we go from six to nine o’clock”—might result in groans of an undesirable sort".

Commercial performance
All About You debuted at number 27 on the US Billboard 200 albums chart and number eight in the US Top R&B/Hip-Hop albums chart, selling 18,000 copies in its first week of sales. As of June 25, 2015, the album has sold 186,000 copies in United States. On October 16, 2017, the album was certified gold by the Recording Industry Association of America (RIAA) for combined sales and album-equivalent units of over 500,000 units.

Track listing

Charts

Weekly charts

Certifications

References 

2010 albums
Jeremih albums
Def Jam Recordings albums